San Sebastián is a city in the Basque Country, Spain.

San Sebastián or San Sebastian may also refer to:

Places

Spain
 San Sebastián (Morcín), a parish in Morcín, Asturias
 San Sebastián de Garabandal, a village in the municipality of Rionansa, Cantabria 
 San Sebastián de La Gomera, a town in the Canary Islands
 San Sebastián de los Ballesteros, a municipality in the province of Córdoba, Andalusia
 San Sebastián de los Reyes, a city in the Community of Madrid

Guatemala
 San Sebastián, Retalhuleu
 San Sebastián Coatán
 San Sebastián Huehuetenango

Mexico
 San Sebastián del Oeste, a town and municipality in Jalisco, Mexico
 San Sebastián, Etzatlán, a locality in Etzatlán municipality, Jalisco, Mexico
 San Sebastián Tlacotepec, Puebla
 San Sebastian, Sinaloa, a place in Sinaloa, Mexico

Oaxaca
 San Sebastián Abasolo
 San Sebastián Coatlán
 San Sebastián Ixcapa
 San Sebastián Nicananduta
 San Sebastián Río Hondo
 San Sebastián Tecomaxtlahuaca
 San Sebastián Teitipac
 San Sebastián Tutla

United States
 San Sebastian River, a tidal channel which flows into Matanzas Bay in Florida, US
 Sebastian, Florida, a city in Indian River County, Florida, US
 San Sebastián, Puerto Rico, a municipality in Puerto Rico

Philippines
 San Sebastian, Samar, a municipality
 San Sebastian, a district of Tarlac City

Colombia
 San Sebastián de Urabá, an abandoned settlement
 San Sebastián, Cauca, Department of Cauca
 San Sebastián de Buenavista, Department of Magdalena, Colombia

Elsewhere

 San Sebastián, Aragua, a city in Venezuela
 San Sebastián, Tierra del Fuego, a settlement in Tierra del Fuego, Argentina
 San Sebastián Airport (Chile)
 San Sebastián Bay, Argentina
 San Sebastián, Comayagua, a municipality in Honduras
 San Sebastian, Lempira, a municipality in Honduras
 San Sebastián, San Vicente, a municipality in El Salvador
 San Sebastián, Quito, an electoral parish of Quito, Ecuador
 San Sebastián District, Cusco, in Cusco Province, Peru
 San Sebastián (district), a district of San José canton in Costa Rica

Music
 San Sebastian (band), a rock band from Hamilton, Ontario, Canada

 "San Sebastian (Revisited)", a song by Sonata Arctica from their 2001 album Silence
 "San Sebastian", a song by Alien Ant Farm from their 2006 album Up in the Attic

Other uses
 Saint Sebastian, an early Christian saint and martyr
 San Sebastián, Toledo, one of the oldest churches of Toledo, Spain
 San Sebastian Church (Manila), a Neo-Gothic church in Manila, Philippines
 Clásica de San Sebastián, a bicycle race
 San Sebastian College – Recoletos, an institution for higher learning in Manila, Philippines
 Siege of San Sebastián, a siege during the Peninsular War in  1813
 San Sebastián, a ship commanded by Francisco de Cortés Hojea on a 1557 expedition to explore Patagonia

See also
 2015 San Sebastián del Oeste ambush, where 15 policemen were killed
 USS St. Sebastian (SP-470), a United States Navy patrol vessel 1917–1919
 Saint-Sébastien (disambiguation)